Maison Radio-Canada (English: CBC House) is the broadcast headquarters, studios and master control for all French-language radio and television services of the Canadian Broadcasting Corporation (known in French as Société Radio-Canada/SRC) including its flagship station CBFT-DT. It is also the main studio for Montreal's local English-language CBC services (CBMT-DT, CBME-FM, and CBM-FM) and the headquarters of Radio Canada International, the CBC's digital international broadcasting service.

The street address of Maison Radio-Canada is 1400 René Lévesque Boulevard East, named for former premier René Lévesque who was once a reporter and commentator for the CBC. The building is situated near the studios of CTV (CFCF-DT), Noovo (CFJP-DT), RDS, RDS Info, MétéoMédia, LCN, and TVA (CFTM-DT) which are at the intersection of Papineau Avenue.

The analogous facility for CBC's English-language networks is the Canadian Broadcasting Centre in Toronto. CBC's corporate headquarters for both languages are in Ottawa at the CBC Ottawa Broadcast Centre.

Geography
The building is accessible within walking distance east of Beaudry station of the Montreal Metro.

For the building itself to be built, most of the Faubourg à m'lasse working-class neighbourhood had to be demolished. On October 1, 1963, the last house was evacuated so the demolition project could go ahead to clear land for the facility.

Redevelopment
As of November 2008, consultations are underway to redevelop the area around Maison Radio-Canada.
The new plans for the eastern part of the present site includes 2000 housing units, offices, commercial space, and public spaces at 1450 René Lévesque Boulevard East, which will cover about three city blocks. Furthermore, the new development would relink the street grid through the site, following the 1960s razing of a working-class neighbourhood popularly known as Faubourg à m'lasse to make way for the Radio-Canada complex.

As of May 2015, the project was halted. The project was relaunched in November 2016, with Broccolini Group selected to construct the new building and Groupe Mach chosen to take over the existing building and reconvert it to new uses. The project finally reached completion in 2020.

See also
CBC Montreal (disambiguation)

References

External links

 CBC—Radio-Canada
 CBC
 Radio-Canada

Canadian Broadcasting Corporation buildings
Skyscrapers in Montreal
Brutalist architecture in Canada
Office buildings completed in 1973
Mass media company headquarters in Canada
Radio studios in Canada
Centre-Sud
Government buildings completed in 1973
1973 establishments in Quebec
Skyscraper office buildings in Canada
Government buildings in Montreal